Farmacias El Amal, was a regional pharmacy chain operating throughout Puerto Rico. At its peak, it operated more than 78 pharmacies across Puerto Rico.  The chain was privately held and was founded in 1973.

Farmacias El Amal stores also contained cosmetics, photo departments as well as a basic pantry department.   Farmacias El Amal was best known for its Pasaporte a la Salud Loyalty card and aggressive promotions including their Black Friday Sales.  Its largest competitors were Walgreens, Kmart, and Walmart. 
 
On March 18, 2009, Farmacias El Amal filed a petition for Chapter 11 protection, with the case subsequently being converted to a Chapter 7 petition on May 20, 2010.

History
This chain started out as a single drugstore in Rio Piedras, Puerto Rico in 1973.  The chain slowly expanded throughout the 1970s and 1980s by opening several additional drugstores mostly in the Carolina and San Juan metropolitan areas as well as in Caguas. By 1994, the chain had grown to 12 drugstores.  During the '80s and '90s, Farmacias El Amal were characterized by their unique aisle layout (a diagonal V) and above average square footage.

In 1995, Farmacias El Amal acquired Farmacias Moscoso, increasing its store count to 45 drugstores.  The company proceeded to modernize its store base, installing POS and Pharmacy systems.  The company also remodeled, relocated and opened many new stores throughout the 1990s and early 2000s.

On January 17, 2008, Walgreens acquired 20 drugstores from Farmacias El Amal. El Amal continued operating its other 41 stores in Puerto Rico. Terms of the transaction were not disclosed, and it was subject to customary closing conditions. Once the agreement was finalized, work began on converting the El Amal stores to Walgreens, including remodeling and changing the store names.

On February 19, 2011, the El Amal drugstore chain ceased operations.

References

External links 

 Bnet Research

Retail companies of Puerto Rico
Defunct pharmacies
Retail companies established in 1973
Retail companies disestablished in 2011
1973 establishments in Puerto Rico
Companies that have filed for Chapter 7 bankruptcy
Health in Puerto Rico